Julius Ludovicus Maria Sabbe (14 February 1846 in Ghent – 3 July 1910 in Bruges) was a Flemish publisher and an active member of the Flemish movement. From 24 September 1869 on, he taught Dutch at the Koninklijk Atheneum (E: Royal Atheneum) of Bruges.

Between 1874 and 1881, he published the monthly magazine De Halletoren, which was succeeded by the liberal magazine Brugsche Beiaard, of which he was the editor, from 1881 up to 1910. He was a staunch supporter of the creation of a seaport for Bruges. When the Flemish weekly Het Volksbelang was founded in 1867, by Julius Vuylsteke, he was one of the editors together with Jozef Van Hoorde, Julius De Vigne, and Adolf Hoste. In 1877 he was awarded by the Royal Academy of Belgium for his cantata Klokke Roelandt.  He took the initiative for the creation of a statue for Jan Breydel and Pieter de Coninck, which was inaugurated in 1887. He was the father of Maurits Sabbe.

Bibliography
 Eenige mannenbeelden (Ghent, 1870)
 Het nationaal beginsel in de Vlaamsche schilderkunst (Ghent, 1874)
 De Taal is gansch het Volk, speech (Antwerp, 1875)
 Groot en Klein, speech (Ghent, 1876)
 Help u zelven, speech (Antwerp, 1877)
 De Klokke Roeland, cantata (Bruges, 1877)
 Brugge's ontwaking, van Eyck's-cantata (Bruges, 1878)
 Grootmoedersvertelboek, by Julius Sabbe and A. Vermast (Bruges, 1883)

See also
 Flemish literature

Sources
 Julius Sabbe en de herleving van Brugge: Een bundel met bijdragen van Kris Carlier (et al.), Liberaal Archief (1996), 
 Julius Sabbe
 Julius Sabbe

External links
 House of Julius Sabbe in Bruges

1846 births
1910 deaths
Writers from Ghent
Flemish activists
Flemish writers